In mathematics, the twisted Poincaré duality is a theorem removing the restriction on Poincaré duality to oriented manifolds. The existence of a global orientation is replaced by carrying along local information, by means of a local coefficient system.

Twisted Poincaré duality for de Rham cohomology
Another version of the theorem with real coefficients features de Rham cohomology with values in the orientation bundle. This is the flat real line bundle denoted , that is trivialized by coordinate charts of the manifold , with transition maps the sign of the Jacobian determinant of the charts transition maps.  As a flat line bundle, it has a de Rham cohomology, denoted by

For M a compact manifold, the top degree cohomology is equipped with a so-called trace morphism
,
that is to be interpreted as integration on M, i.e., evaluating against the fundamental class.

Poincaré duality for differential forms is then the conjunction, for M connected, of the following two statements:
 The trace morphism is a linear isomorphism.
 The cup product, or exterior product of differential forms

is non-degenerate.

The oriented Poincaré duality is contained in this statement, as understood from the fact that the orientation bundle o(M) is trivial if the manifold is oriented, an orientation being a global trivialization, i.e., a nowhere vanishing parallel section.

See also
Local system
Dualizing sheaf
Verdier duality

References
Some references are provided in the answers to this thread on MathOverflow.
The online book Algebraic and geometric surgery by Andrew Ranicki.
 

Algebraic topology
Manifolds
Duality theories
Theorems in topology